Thomas Franklin Daniel (born September 14, 1954) is an American botanist, and teacher. He is a specialist of the botanical family Acanthaceae. In 1975 he obtained his undergraduate from Duke University. In 1980, he obtained his doctorate at the University of Michigan. In 1981, he was assistant professor. Between 1981 and 1985 he was an assistant curator of the Arizona State University Herbarium.

Since 1986, Daniel belongs to the California Academy of Sciences where he is Curator of Botany, Emeritus. In 1987 he was a conservation assistant. From 1988 to 1991: assistant curator. In 2009, he was president of the Botany Department, a position he also held between 1988 and 1990 and between 1994 and 1996. Since 1998 he has been a research professor at San Francisco State University. He is also a researcher at the Arizona-Sonora Desert Museum.

Selected publications

Books 
 
 
 1999.  Flora of the Tehuacán-Cuicatlán Valley: fasciculo 23. Acanthaceae Juss.  Ed. UNAM. 102 pp.  online
 1986.  Systematics of Tetramerium (Acanthaceae) . Volume 12 of Systematic botany monographs. Ed. Am. Soc. Of Plant Taxonomists. 134 pp. 
 1983.  Carlowrightia (Acanthaceae) . No. 34 of Neotropical Flora. Ed. New York Botanical Garden. 116 pp. 
 1980.  A systematic study of the genus Carlowrightia (Acanthaceae) . Ed. The University Of Michigan. 393 pp.

Honors 
 Member of the American Society of Plant Taxonomists, 2001 and 2002, President
 Member of the Botanical Society of California, Treasurer from 1986 to 1989
 Since 2003, fund manager of the Stanley Smith Horticultural Trust
 Member of the California Academy of Sciences Academy
 Member of the International Plant Taxonomy Association
 Since 1994, member of the Project Species Plantarum

Plants named in his honor 

 (Acanthaceae) Justicia danielii Durkee

References

External links 

21st-century American botanists
American explorers
1954 births
Living people
University of Michigan alumni